Twentieth Century British History is a peer reviewed academic journal of the history of Britain in the twentieth century. It is published by Oxford University Press.

References 

Oxford University Press academic journals
British history journals
Quarterly journals